Fall River is a city in Massachusetts, United States.

Fall River may also refer to:

Cities and towns

Canada 
Fall River, Nova Scotia

United States 
Fall River, Kansas
Fall River, Tennessee, site of a National Register of Historic Places listing in Lawrence County, Tennessee
Fall River, Wisconsin
Fall River County, South Dakota
Fall River, Massachusetts

Rivers

Canada 
Fall River (Ontario)

United States 
Fall River (Plumas County, California), a Lake Oroville source tributary
Fall River (Shasta County, California), a river tributary to the Pit River in Shasta County, California.
Fall River (Clear Creek County, Colorado), a tributary of Clear Creek in Clear Creek County, Colorado.
Fall River (Larimer County, Colorado), a tributary of the Big Thompson River in Larimer County, Colorado
Fall River (Wyoming, Idaho), a river in Yellowstone National Park and Idaho
Fall River (Fremont County, Idaho), a river in Fremont County, Idaho
Fall River (Kansas), a river in Wilson County, Kansas
Fall River (Maryland), a river in Baltimore, Maryland
Fall River (Connecticut River tributary), a river in Franklin County, Massachusetts
Fall River (Farmington River), a river in Berkshire County, Massachusetts
 Fall River (Middle Fork Feather River), a tributary of the Middle Fork Feather River in Butte County, California
Fall River (Minnesota), a stream in northeastern Minnesota
Fall River (Oregon), a tributary of the Deschutes River in central Oregon
Fall River (South Dakota), a river in Fall River County
Hoback River or Fall River, a river in Wyoming

Other
Fall River (MBTA station), a commuter rail station in Fall River, Massachusetts
Fall River, Warren and Providence Railroad, a railroad in southeastern Massachusetts and Rhode Island
Fall River murders, three murders committed from October 1979 to February 1980 in Fall River, Massachusetts
Fall River (TV series), a 2021 Epix documentary series about the murders
"Fall River" (short story), a 1931 short story by John Cheever

See also
Falls River (disambiguation)
Fall Creek (disambiguation)